Bobrovka is a military air base in Samara Oblast, Russia.  It is located 39 km east of the city of Samara.  The base largely served the interceptor air defense role for the Soviet Air Force, and was in the Sverdlovsk Air Defense District.

Bobrovka had been observed by 1957 by Western Lockheed U-2 overflights.  A 1974 US satellite mission identified up to 89 swept-wing aircraft, most of which were likely Sukhoi Su-9 (NATO: Fishpot) aircraft.  By 1981 the interceptor regiment was one of four in the USSR still operating the Su-9.

Bobrovka became the Soviet Union's primary storage facility for the aging Su-9, and by 1981 at least 243 Su-9 aircraft were observed parked at Bobrovka.

The base was home to the:
 683rd Fighter Aviation Regiment between 1952 and 1997
 237th Independent Helicopter Squadron

The base was reportedly closed after 2007.

References

Russian Air Force bases
Soviet Air Force bases
Soviet Air Defence Force bases